Isobel Heyman  is a British psychiatrist and consultant at the Great Ormond Street Hospital. She was named as the Royal College of Psychiatrists Psychiatrist of the Year in 2015.

Early life and education 
Heyman first studied pharmacology, before training in medicine at the UCL Medical School. She trained in psychiatry at the Maudsley Hospital. She earned a doctorate in developmental neurobiology at Guy's and St Thomas' NHS Foundation Trust, where she investigated rhombomere boundaries. In 1995 she returned to the Institute of Psychiatry, Psychology and Neuroscience, where she specialised in child and adolescent psychiatry.

Research and career 
In 1998 Heyman founded the first United Kingdom (UK) clinic for young people with obsessive–compulsive disorder. She was involved with the Tourette syndrome clinic and the Great Ormond Street Hospital (GOSH) epilepsy programme.

One in five young people in the UK experience mental health disorders, and hospitals struggle with the demand for psychological services. In response, Heyman looked to provide young people already seeking medical care in hospital with a solution. The psychological medicine team she led at GOSH was recognised by the Child and Adolescent Mental Health Services for "The Lucy Project", a drop-in mental health booth that provided accessible, low-intensity early interventions for young people and their families who were concerned about mental health. The booth was named after Lucille "Lucy" van Pelt, the character from Peanuts. The booth was named The BMJ's Mental Health Team of the Year Award in 2021.

Awards and honours 

 2012 Times Best Children's Doctors
 2015 Royal College of Psychiatrists Psychiatrist of the Year
 2022 Member of the British Empire in New Year Honours

Select publications

References 

Year of birth missing (living people)
Living people
British psychiatrists
British women psychiatrists
Alumni of the UCL Medical School
Physicians of Great Ormond Street Hospital
Members of the Order of the British Empire